Brazilians in India form a very small community consisting of immigrants and expatriates (mostly footballers and fashion models) from Brazil. According to the Brazilian consulate as of 2020 there are some 860 Brazilians living in India.

Overview

Immigrants

There are small Brazilian communities in Chennai, Goa& Bombay (Mumbai). Currently, there are about 40 Brazilian families in Goa itself and there is a Brazilian consulate located in Bombay. Many Brazilians settled in Goa because its culturally similar to Brazil as they were both former Portuguese colonies.

Brazilian culture is also visible in Goa. Samba music and dance became part of the local festivities of Goa Carnival in 2008 and Goa has been promoting Brazilian studies. Goa University had a Brazilian chair for Latin American studies for many years and they offer a variety of courses such as Brazilian literature, philosophy and sociology.

Expatriates
India is emerging as a leading market for second-string footballers from Latin America, particularly Brazil. Brazilian footballers are playing club football in India because they get paid more in India that they can ever hope to earn in Brazil. Coaches from Brazil also came to train Indian footballers. The Brazilian community in Chennai are mainly involved in business, IT and Automobile Manufacture.

The Indian Fashion Industry also recruits models from Brazil as their approach to fashion is more professional and their exposure has been extensive. They are also recruited because they are much less inhibited, so assignments which require them to don a bikini or a swimsuit are easier than for Indian girls. However they earn less than Indian models but the rates are at par with other parts of the world. The only difference is that they probably have to do three shows instead of one in India.

Notable people
 Bruna Abdullah - Brazilian model and actress
 José Ramirez Barreto - Footballer
 Gabriela Bertante - Model
 Edmar Figueira - Footballer
 Cristiano Júnior - Footballer
 Nathalia Kaur - Brazilian model and actress
 Eduardo Chacon Coelho Lacerda - Footballer
 Josimar da Silva Martins - Footballer
 Juliano Pescarolo Martins - Footballer
 Giselli Monteiro - Brazilian actress and model
 Carlos Roberto Pereira - Brazilian football coach
 Luciano Sabrosa - Footballer
 Roberto Mendes Silva - Footballer
 Izabelle Leite - Model, Actress
 Gloria Arieira - scholar

See also
 Brazil–India relations
 Indians in Brazil
 Caminho das Índias
 Luso-Indian

References

India
 
Brazilian
 
India